Hanekonma (はね駒) is a 1986 Japanese television serial, the 36th NHK asadora drama. Written by Koharu Terauchi, it was inspired by the life of Haruko Isomura (1877-1918), a pioneer female newspaper reporter of the Meiji and Taishō eras.

Like its predecessor, Oshin, an English-subtitled version of the serial, described as a "high-class soapie", was broadcast in Australia on SBS, under the title Rin, in 1988.

Plot
Tachibana Rin, nicknamed "Hanekonma" (filly), grows up in Sōma, Fukushima. Together she and her mother scrape up enough money for her to attend a Christian girls' school in Sendai, Miyagi. Though disowned by her father, she studies English and, after some early struggles, becomes a teacher. Later she marries and moves to Tokyo. After her husband's business fails, and while juggling raising a family, she succeeds in becoming Japan's first female newspaper reporter.

Development
Like a previous asadora early morning drama Oshin (1983), and a subsequent taiga evening drama Inochi (1988), Hanekonma reflected women’s history and was developed by NHK to appeal to female audiences.

Cast
Yuki Saito as Tachibana Rin
Kirin Kiki as Tachibana Yae (Rin's mother)
Nenji Kobayashi as Tachibana Kojirō (Rin's father)
Ken Watanabe as Onodera Genzō (Rin's husband)

References

1986 Japanese television series debuts
1986 Japanese television series endings
Asadora
Japanese drama television series
Television series set in the 19th century
Television series set in the 20th century